During the 2006–07 English football season, Swansea City Football Club competed in Football League One where they finished in 7th position with 72 points.

Final league table

Results
Swansea City's score comes first

Legend

Football League One

FA Cup

League Cup

Football League Trophy

Squad statistics

References
General
Swansea City 2006–07 at soccerbase.com (use drop down list to select relevant season)

Specific

Swansea City A.F.C. seasons
Swansea City